Talay Riley is a British singer-songwriter.

Career
At the age of 18, Talay Riley signed his first major publishing deal with Global Publishing. His first appearance was in 2009, when he appeared on rapper Chipmunk's single which peaked at number 7 on the UK Singles Chart. He then went on to sign with Major Label Jive/Sony Records. Talay has toured with many UK/US artists including Skepta, Usher's Arena tour, and Trey Songz.

Discography

Mixtapes
 Going to California (2011)

Singles

As lead artist

As featured artist

Writing discography

References

English songwriters
English pop singers
Living people
Place of birth missing (living people)
Musicians from London
21st-century English singers
Year of birth missing (living people)